Altheim is a municipality in the Biberach district of Baden-Württemberg, Germany. It is located between Riedlingen and Langenenslingen.

History
With German mediatization, Altheim was in 1806 granted to the Kingdom of Württemberg from the County of Thurn und Taxis. Altheim began a period of substantial growth after World War II that lasted into the 1980s. The town hall, parish church, and rectory, all on the town center, were remodeled in 1986.

Geography
Altheim is physically located on the left bank of the Danube, on the Iller-Lech Plateau. Elevation above sea level ranges from  Normalnull (NN) on the Danube as it flows into Riedlingen to  NN on top of the Österberg.

The Storchenwiesen Federally-protected nature reserve (Naturschutzgebiet) is located within Altheim's municipal area.

Coat of arms
The municipal coat of arms for Altheim show a beaver, facing right but turned to the left, holding a cartouche topped with a ducal crown, both of gold, containing the Austrian flag in its front paws standing on a grassy shore upon a field divided party per fess into gold and red sections. This pattern was given to Altheim by Leopold I, Holy Roman Emperor, on 21 January 1681. The beaver, paired with the grass and water, is a reference to Altheim's old name, Altheim am Biberach, and the cartouche refers to Biberach's rule by an Austrian vogt.

Transport
Altheim is only connected to nearby villages and to Riedlingen, though it is served by several transit bus lines.

See also
 Altheim culture

References

External links 
Altheim culture at Comparative Archaeology

Biberach (district)
Württemberg